"Helplessly Hoping" is a 1969 song by the American folk rock group Crosby, Stills, and Nash written by Stephen Stills, and using both alliteration and wordplay in its lyrics. They recorded the song at Wally Heider's Studio 3, Hollywood in December 1968 during their first recording session as a group, with producer Paul Rothchild. The song was first released by Atlantic Records on Crosby, Stills, and Nash's eponymous debut album on May 29, 1969. In June 1969, they released it as the B-side of their debut single "Marrakesh Express".

Lyrics
The song is about two lovers who don't know what to do in a psychological setting. Alliteration is used throughout the song; "Helplessly Hoping", "Wordlessly Watching", and "Stand by the Stairway". 

Wordplay is also employed — the chorus contains number words with dual meanings:
They are One Person,
They are Two Alone,
They are Three Together,
They are Four Each Other.

The play on three of the Chorus lines would go:
They are Too Alone,
They are Free Together,
They are For Each Other.

Personnel
David Crosby–vocals
Stephen Stills–vocals, guitar
Graham Nash–vocals

In popular culture
 The song was prominently featured in the 2018 Alex Garland film Annihilation.
 The song was also featured briefly in the 2020 Naughty Dog game The Last of Us Part II, with Joel playing the song on guitar.
 The song was also featured briefly in the 2019 film The Art of Racing in the Rain.

Cover versions
 The song was covered by the American bluegrass band J. D. Crowe & the New South in 1986. The cover was included in their seventh studio album Straight Ahead.
 The song was also covered by the American a cappella group Home Free in 2017.
 The song was also covered by the American rock band Of Mice & Men in 2021. The cover was included in their third EP Ad Infinitum and their seventh studio album Echo.
 The song was also covered by the American band Foxes and Fossils in 2013.

References

1969 songs
Crosby, Stills, Nash & Young songs
Songs written by Stephen Stills
Atlantic Records singles